Rebecca Corry (born March 23, 1971) is an American comedian, writer and actress.

Biography
Corry was born in Kent, Washington, and moved to Chicago, Illinois, at age 19.

In 2006, she was a finalist on the fourth season of NBC's Last Comic Standing. Her half-hour Comedy Central Presents special premiered in 2009. Corry founded the Stand Up for Pits Foundation to work against abuse and discrimination towards pit bulls. In 2014, she organized the One Million Pibble March On Washington, which had an estimated 4,500 attendees, in an effort to end breed-specific legislation and dog fighting.

In 2017, Corry was one of several female comedians who alleged sexual misconduct by comedian Louis C.K.

Filmography
 Big Fat Liar (2002) as "Astrid Barker", a dog-loving secretary of Marty Wolf
 The King of Queens (2005)
 Yes Man (2008)
 Comedy Central Presents (2009)
 Rules of Engagement (2010)
 One Big Happy (2015)
 2 Broke Girls, "And the '80s Movie" (2016)

References

External links

 Official website
 

1971 births
Last Comic Standing contestants
Living people
People from Kent, Washington
21st-century American actresses
American film actresses
American television actresses
Actresses from Washington (state)
American women comedians
21st-century American comedians